Veno Luzon Belk (born March 7, 1963) is a former professional American football tight end who played for the Buffalo Bills in 1987.

External links
Pro-Football-Reference

1963 births
Buffalo Bills players
Living people
American football tight ends
People from Tifton, Georgia
Michigan State Spartans football players
Players of American football from Georgia (U.S. state)